Priscilla Moran (November 23, 1917 – November 11, 2006) was an American silent film actress. She was born in Sedalia, Missouri.

She made her film debut in 1922, and retired from the silver screen in 1937 at the age of 20, having appeared in fourteen films.

Personal life
Moran was the daughter of Leo Anthony Moran, who was also an actor. After he died in Arizona in March 1926, Myrtle and John C. Ragland became her guardians: this caused a custody battle in which she was eventually given to her paternal aunt Margaret Moran Becker.

Selected filmography
 The Toll of the Sea (1922)
 Daddies (1924)
 Love and Glory (1924)
 A Self-Made Failure (1924)
 Her Marriage Vow (1924)
 Up the Ladder (1925)
 No Babies Wanted (1928)

References

External links

 
Portrait of Priscilla Moran

1917 births
2006 deaths
American child actresses
American film actresses
Actresses from Missouri
People from Sedalia, Missouri
20th-century American actresses
American silent film actresses
21st-century American women